Miramar was a New Zealand parliamentary electorate in the south-eastern suburbs of Wellington. It was created in 1946, replacing Wellington East, and was replaced by Rongotai for the first MMP election of 1996.

Population centres
The 1941 New Zealand census had been postponed due to World War II, so the 1946 electoral redistribution had to take ten years of population growth and movements into account. The North Island gained a further two electorates from the South Island due to faster population growth. The abolition of the country quota through the Electoral Amendment Act, 1945 reduced the number and increased the size of rural electorates. None of the existing electorates remained unchanged, 27 electorates were abolished, eight former electorates were re-established, and 19 electorates were created for the first time, including Miramar. The electorate's boundary was initially located on the Rongotai isthmus that is occupied by Wellington Airport. This boundary slowly shifted towards the city of Wellington in subsequent electoral redistributions. The electorate boundaries were unaffected by the electoral redistributions in 1972 and 1987. The electorate was abolished in 1996, when it was replaced by the  electorate.

History
The electorate was marginal, and changed several times between the parties. The first representative in 1946 was Bob Semple of the Labour Party.

Members of Parliament
Key

Election results

1993 election

1990 election

1987 election

1984 election

1981 election

1978 election

1975 election

1972 election

1969 election

1966 election

1963 election

1960 election

1957 election

1954 election

1951 election

1949 election

1946 election

Notes

References

Historical electorates of New Zealand
Politics of the Wellington Region
1946 establishments in New Zealand
1996 disestablishments in New Zealand